Kalateh-ye Mirza Abbas (also Romanized as Kalāteh-ye Mīrzā ‘Abbās; also known as Mīrzā ‘Abbās) is a village in Shirin Su Rural District, Maneh District, Maneh and Samalqan County, North Khorasan Province, Iran. At the 2006 census, its population was 83, in 15 families.

References 

Populated places in Maneh and Samalqan County